Carlo Antonio Rambaldi (1680-1717) was an Italian painter of the Baroque period, active in his native Bologna.

Biography
Known as a figure painter, he was a pupil of Domenico Maria Viani. He painted in Macerata, Rome, and Turin. In Bologna, he painted in the Sacristy of the church of San Petronio. For his work in Piacenza, he was awarded a knighthood. Returning to Bologna in 1717 with his wife, he drowned in the Taro river. He painted a Death of St. Joseph for the church of Santi Gregorio e Siro; a Visitation for San Giuseppe Sposo ; and a St. Francis Xavier for the church of Santa Lucia.

References

External links

17th-century Italian painters
Italian male painters
18th-century Italian painters
Italian Baroque painters
Painters from Bologna
1717 deaths
1680 births
18th-century Italian male artists